Lurgorri is a railway station in Gernika, Basque Country, Spain. It is owned by Euskal Trenbide Sarea and operated by Euskotren. It lies on the Urdaibai line.

History 
The station wasn't part of the line when it opened in 1888. It was built by Euskotren in 1988 to better serve the new developments in the southern part of the town.

Services 
The station is served by Euskotren Trena line E4. It runs every 30 minutes (in each direction) during weekdays, and every hour during weekends.

References 

Euskotren Trena stations
Railway stations in Biscay
Railway stations in Spain opened in 1988
1988 establishments in the Basque Country (autonomous community)